Oliver Newman may refer to:
 Oliver Peck Newman, president of the Board of Commissioners of the District of Columbia
 Oliver Michael Griffiths Newman, Australian metallurgist, administrator and amateur ornithologist